The 1960 Minnesota gubernatorial election took place on November 8, 1960. Republican Party of Minnesota candidate Elmer Andersen defeated Minnesota Democratic–Farmer–Labor Party challenger Orville Freeman.

Results

See also
 List of Minnesota gubernatorial elections

External links
 http://www.sos.state.mn.us/home/index.asp?page=653
 http://www.sos.state.mn.us/home/index.asp?page=657

Minnesota
Gubernatorial
1960
November 1960 events in the United States